Aslak Fonn Witry (born 10 March 1996) is a Norwegian footballer who plays as a defender for Bulgarian club Ludogorets Razgrad.

Career
Fonn Witry started his career at Rosenborg as a junior. Fonn Witry signed with Ranheim in 2015.

Fonn Witry made his debut for Ranheim in Eliteserien in a 4–1 win against Stabæk.

On the 20th of December 2018, he signed for Djurgårdens IF in Allsvenskan. He got his debut in the first game of the 2019 season against GIF Sundsvall on 1 April.

On 30 August 2022, he signed for Ludogorets Razgrad of the Bulgarian First League.

Career statistics

Club

Honours
Djurgårdens IF
Allsvenskan: 2019

References

External links
 Career stats - Voetbal International

1996 births
Living people
Footballers from Trondheim
Norwegian footballers
Norwegian people of French descent
Norway youth international footballers
Association football defenders
Rosenborg BK players
Ranheim Fotball players
Djurgårdens IF Fotboll players
AZ Alkmaar players
PFC Ludogorets Razgrad players
Norwegian First Division players
Eliteserien players
Allsvenskan players
Eredivisie players
First Professional Football League (Bulgaria) players
Norwegian expatriate footballers
Expatriate footballers in Sweden
Norwegian expatriate sportspeople in Sweden
Expatriate footballers in the Netherlands
Norwegian expatriate sportspeople in the Netherlands
Expatriate footballers in Bulgaria
Norwegian expatriate sportspeople in Bulgaria